Joshua Ramos (born April 25, 2000) is a United States Virgin Islands international soccer player who plays as a defender for Lakeland United of the UPSL, and the United States Virgin Islands national team.

Club career
Ramos graduated from Sebring High School in 2018. During his senior year, he tallied the most goals and assists for the team with 14 and 15, respectively. As a youth Ramos played for the Auburndale Scream of the Super Y League. He was with the club through 2018.

In October 2018 Ramos was part of a team that traveled to Madrid for matches against Getafe CF, Real Valladolid, and clubs from lower divisions in front of scouts from Spain and Portugal. He also participated in training with Atlético Madrid.

In 2019, it was announced that Ramos would join Latvian club Albatroz SC but he eventually joined AFA Olaine of the Latvian Second League, the third tier of football in the country, instead. The initial deal was for two and a half months. On May 26 he made his debut for the club in a 1–2 defeat to FK Kalupe which saw Olaine knocked out in the first round of the 2019 Latvian Cup. He made his league debut for the club four days later as a starter in a 4–1 league victory over DSVK Traktors. He made his second league appearance for the club on June 2 as he started and played the full 90 minutes of 1–1 draw with FK Lielupe. During the 2019 league season he made three league appearances for the club, scoring one goal, with his goal coming during a 3–2 victory over FK Aliance on June 5, his final appearance for AFA Olaine. Despite his strong performances Ramos was not part of the roster the following season. He was previously also involved with major Latvian club FK Ventspils.

By September 2019, Ramos had returned to the United States and was competing for Winter Haven United FC of the UPSL and quickly won Man-of-the-Match honors. He returned to the club for the 2020 season. In 2022 Ramos and his brother Dylan moved to fellow UPSL side Lakeland United FC. They became the club’s first two current internationals when they were called up for 2022–23 CONCACAF Nations League C matches in June of that year.

In March 2022 it was announced that Ramos had committed to play college soccer in the United States for the Roadrunners of Dalton State College.

International career
Ramos made his senior international debut for the United States Virgin Islands on November 16, 2019 in a 2019–20 CONCACAF Nations League C match against the Cayman Islands. He went on to appear in two matches in the tournament. In March 2021, Ramos was named as part of Gilberto Damiano's 23-man squad for 2022 FIFA World Cup qualification matches later that month. He started and played the full match in the team's opening 0–3 defeat to Antigua and Barbuda.

International appearances

International statistics

Personal
Ramos's brother Dylan plays as a goalkeeper. After being named Highlands News-Sun All-Highlands Boys Soccer Player of the Year in 2019, he traveled to Spain with his brother for their training stint with Real Valladolid.

References

External links
National Football Teams profile
Soccerway profile
Dalton State Roadrunners profile

2000 births
Living people
United States Virgin Islands soccer players
United States Virgin Islands expatriate soccer players
United States Virgin Islands international soccer players
Association football defenders
Expatriate footballers in Latvia